is a Japanese manga series written and illustrated by Tsuyoshi Matsumoto. It was serialized in Shogakukan's seinen manga magazine Monthly Ikki from April to September 2014, when the magazine ceased its publication, and the series was transferred to Hibana, where it ran from March 2015 to June 2017.

Publication
The series was transferred to Monthly Ikkis replacement, where it ran from March 6, 2015, to June 7, 2017. Shogakukan collected its chapters in three tankōbon volumes, released from August 10 to October 12, 2017.

Volume list

Reception
The series was recommended by Japanese filmmaker Makoto Shinkai. The series ranked #17, alongside Adrian Tomine's Killing and Dying and Ai Tanaka's Limbo the King, on "The Best Manga 2018 Kono Manga wo Yome!" ranking by Freestyle magazine.

References

Further reading

External links
 

Seinen manga
Shogakukan manga